Mamadou Djim Kola (27 January 1940 – 11 December 2004) was an Burkinabe filmmaker who directed feature films and short films.

Early life
Mamadou Djim Kola was born in Dapyoa, Ouagadougou. His father was a fan of cinema and owned a projector that he used to show films to the local neighbourhood.

He attended elementary school at the Ouagadougou Center School (1947 to 1955) before graduating as a teacher from the 'Cours Antoine Roche de Ouahigouya' school (1955-1959).

Career
After graduating as a teacher Kola felt the pull of cinema and enrolled in a correspondence course with the Independent Center of French Cinema (CICF) in 1961. This was in spite of social pressure that teachers were more important to Burkina Faso than film directors.

Le Sang Des Parias (1972) was the first feature film produced in Burkina Faso. After the nationalisation of cinemas in 1969 government money was available and the film was state funded.

It was screened at the FESPACO festival the following year. The festival helped create a cinema community in sub-Saharan Africa and was the site from which many African cinematic influences emerged. It won the Jury Prize and Burkinabe cinema was launched.

From 1976 to 1979 he worked as technical director of the Inter-African Film Production Center (CIPROFILM). From 1980 to 1989 he joined the CIDC-CIPROFILM.

From 1990 until his retirement in 1993, he worked at the Ministry of Information and Culture.

Djim Kola was well regarded in Burkina Faso and was affectionately known as the 'Dean' by his associates. His funeral was well attended by dignitaries including the head of culture at the time, Mahamoudou Ouedraogo.

In 2000 he was decorated Knight of the Order of Merit of Arts and Letters. This was in light of his cinematic achievements and his fight against caste discrimination and xenophobia which are evident in his films.

Personal life

Filmography

Accolades

Notes

References

External links

1940 births
2004 deaths
Burkinabé film directors
People from Ouagadougou
Members of the Order of Merit
21st-century Burkinabé people